Drachmann or Drachman is a surname. Notable people with the surname include:

Drachmann:
 Holger Drachmann (1846–1908), Danish poet and dramatist
 Janus Drachmann (born 1988), Danish professional football midfielder

Drachman:
 Bernard Drachman (1861–1945), American leader of Orthodox Judaism
 Theodore S. Drachman (1904–1988), public health official and author

Danish-language surnames
German-language surnames
Jewish surnames